Bradamante is an opera by the French composer Louis Lacoste, first performed at the Académie Royale de Musique (the Paris Opera) on 2 May 1707. It takes the form of a tragédie en musique in a prologue and five acts. The libretto, by Pierre-Charles Roy, is based on Orlando Furioso by Ludovico Ariosto.

Sources
 Libretto at "Livrets baroques"
 Félix Clément and Pierre Larousse Dictionnaire des Opéras, Paris, 1881, page 119

French-language operas
Tragédies en musique
Operas by Louis Lacoste
Operas
1707 operas
Operas based on works by Ludovico Ariosto